Mikhail Zhukov may refer to:

 Mikhail Zhukov (ice hockey) (born 1983) Russian hockey player
 Mikhail Zhukov (conductor) (1901—1960) Soviet conductor and composer